Roland Johnson (19451994) was an advocate for the rights of people with disabilities and one of the founders of Self Advocates Becoming Empowered (SABE). He spent 13 years institutionalized at Pennhurst State School and Hospital, until he was released in 1971 following the civil rights case, Halderman v. Pennhurst State School and Hospital.

Childhood
Johnson was born 14 September 1945. He was the youngest of nine children – six girls and three boys. He and one sister, Madeleine, were born twins, but in both cases the twin sibling died in their infancy. The Johnson family lived in a three-bedroom house, first on Ellsworth Street across from the Christian Union Church in South Philadelphia, then later at 2435 North Cleveland Street in North Philadelphia. Johnson's mother worked as a housekeeper and his father as an auto mechanic. Vera, the oldest child, was often in charge of the house, watching the younger siblings, preparing meals and making sure the chores got done.

As a child, Johnson stayed at home because public schools were unable or unwilling to accommodate him. He often stole food from stores due to his insatiable appetite. To punish him, his mother would heat a knife on the stove and burn his hand with it. It became clear that the family was unable to care for a disabled child, so they decided to send him to Pennhurst.

Pennhurst
In 1958, when Johnson was 13 years old, his mother consulted with other family members and decided that she was no longer capable of handling Johnson's growing discipline problems. They decided to commit him to Pennhurst State School and Hospital, where he would live for 13 years, until he was released in 1971 at the age of 26.

Advocacy 
After his release from Pennhurst, he went through a difficult transition back to the outside world. After a series of illnesses, he joined a psychiatric day program that helped improve his life. In the early 1980s, Johnson became involved with a self-advocacy organization called Speaking for Ourselves, eventually becoming the president of the Philadelphia chapter.

In 1990 Johnson became one of two representatives from the Northeast to the National Steering Committee on Self Advocacy, which in August 1991 became the board of directors of Self Advocates Becoming Empowered (SABE).

Death
Johnson died August 29, 1994, at the age of 48, in a house fire.

Lost in a Desert World
Johnson told his autobiography as an oral history in a series of audio recordings made by Karl Williams. It was published posthumously in 2002 as Lost in a Desert World.

References

Bibliography

External links
 "Who's in Control?", keynote speech by Roland Johnson at the third international People First Conference, 14 June 1993.
i go home, a documentary about former residents and the closure of Pennhurst; includes a segment on Johnson.
 Finding Aid for the Speaking for Ourselves Papers held at the Pennsylvania History Coalition Honoring People with Disability (PHCHPD).
 Visionary Voices, a collection of oral history interviews with leaders of Pennsylvania's intellectual disability rights movement at Temple University, Institute on Disabilities.
 Roland Johnson's panel is in block number 03798 of the NAMES Project, AIDS Memorial Quilt.

American disability rights activists
American people with disabilities
Deinstitutionalization in the United States
African-American activists
People with HIV/AIDS
1945 births
1994 deaths